The women's team event at the 2018 Asian Games took place on 29 August 2018 at the Gelora Bung Karno Aquatic Stadium.

Schedule
All times are Western Indonesia Time (UTC+07:00)

Results
Legend
FR — Reserve in free
RR — Reserve in technical and free
TR — Reserve in technical

References

External links
Artistic swimming at the 2018 Asian Games

Women's team